Kristijan Belić (born 25 March 2001) is a Serbian professional footballer who plays as a midfielder for Partizan. Born in Belgium, Belić has represented Serbia U21 at youth international levels up to under-21s.

Playing career

Youth career  
He trained with the Serbian White Eagles Academy in Canada when his father was involved with the senior team from 2006 to 2007.

Personal life
Belić is the son of former goalkeeper Dušan Belić. His brother Luka is also a footballer.

Career statistics

Notes

References

2001 births
Living people
People from Sint-Truiden
Footballers from Limburg (Belgium)
Serbian footballers
Serbia youth international footballers
Serbia under-21 international footballers
Belgian footballers
Belgian people of Serbian descent
Association football midfielders
OFK Beograd players
West Ham United F.C. players
Olympiacos F.C. players
FK Čukarički players
FK Partizan players
Serbian SuperLiga players
Expatriate footballers in England
Serbian expatriate footballers
Belgian expatriate footballers
Serbian expatriate sportspeople in England
Belgian expatriate sportspeople in England
Expatriate footballers in Greece
Serbian expatriate sportspeople in Greece
Belgian expatriate sportspeople in Greece